The Henry Ford Bridge, also known as the Badger Avenue Bridge, is a bridge located in Los Angeles County, Southern California. It carries the Pacific Harbor Line railroad across the Cerritos Channel to Terminal Island from San Pedro, to serve the Port of Los Angeles and Port of Long Beach. It was built to accommodate operations at the Ford Long Beach Assembly plant which opened in 1930 and was closed in 1959.

The original 1924 bascule bridge was dismantled and replaced in 1996 by a vertical-lift bridge.

Bascule bridge
 

The contract for the bascule bridge was placed by The Los Angeles Board of Harbor Commissioners in 1922. The bridge was designed by Joseph Baermann Strauss and fabricated by the American Bridge Company.

It was formed of a pair of  trunnion bascule leaves which formed a one span Warren through-truss. There were two  tower spans and two  timber approaches.

See also
Commodore Schuyler F. Heim Bridge
List of bridges documented by the Historic American Engineering Record in California
Vincent Thomas Bridge
Bridges in Los Angeles County, California

References

External links

Bridges in Los Angeles County, California
Bascule bridges in the United States
Vertical lift bridges in California
Railroad bridges in California
Los Angeles Harbor Region
Terminal Island
Buildings and structures in Long Beach, California
Transportation buildings and structures in Los Angeles
Bridges completed in 1924
Demolished bridges in the United States
Demolished buildings and structures in Los Angeles
Buildings and structures demolished in 1996
Bridges completed in 1996
Continuous truss bridges in the United States
Ford Motor Company facilities
Historic American Engineering Record in California
1924 establishments in California